Chocolate Finger may refer to:

Cadbury Fingers, British chocolate biscuits
The nickname of Anthony Ward, hedge fund manager for Armajaro